Colthurst may refer to:

Surname
Edmund Colthurst (1527–after 1611), English landowner
James Colthurst (born 1957), British radiologist
John Colthurst (disambiguation)
Matthew Colthurst (before 1517–1559), English MP

Other uses
Colthurst, Virginia, United States
Colthurst baronets, a title in the Baronetage of Ireland